List of mayors of Alexandria may refer to 

 List of mayors of Alexandria, New South Wales Australia
 List of mayors of Alexandria, Virginia in the United States of America